Vincent Elwin (born 11 December 1946) is a Dominican cricketer. He played in three first-class matches for the Windward Islands in 1969/70 and 1970/71.

See also
 List of Windward Islands first-class cricketers

References

External links
 

1946 births
Living people
Dominica cricketers
Windward Islands cricketers